Wichita Falls High School (WFHS) is a public school in Wichita Falls, Texas, United States.  It is part of the Wichita Falls Independent School District (WFISD) and is one of the district's three high schools.

Located at 2149 Avenue H and Coyote Blvd., the school serves students in grades nine through twelve.

As the first high school in the city, Wichita Falls High School is locally known as "Old High." The school was founded in 1891 and the current building was built in 1922 and is a state historic landmark.

The high school's mascot is the coyote.

Student demographics
As of the 2013–2014 school year, Wichita Falls High School had a total of 1,473 students (47.41% White, 35.2% Hispanic, 15.6% African American, 1.8% Asian, and 0.3% Native American).

2011–2012 accountability rating
Based on the accountability ratings released by the Texas Education Agency on August 1, 2012, Wichita Falls High School is currently rated "Academically Acceptable".

The WFISD also awarded Wichita Falls High School with an award for the district's highest GPA, every year from 1991 to 2002. The award was discontinued in 2002.

Athletics

Wichita Falls had one of the most predominant football programs for more than 30 years, from the late 1930s to the early 1970s. Under the guidance of head coaches Ted Jeffries (1931–43), Thurman Jones (1944–46), Joe Golding (1947–61), and Donnell Crosslin (1965–79), the Wichita Falls Coyotes made the state finals ten times between 1937 and 1971, winning six times.

As of the 2022–2023 football season, Wichita Falls High School has made playoffs 45 times, winning eight Quarterfinal Championships, seventeen Regional Championships, twenty-one Area Championships, twenty-three Bi-District Championships, and thirty-six District Championships since 1923.

In September 2007, Texas Monthly Magazine named Wichita Falls High School as the top high school football program in state history.

Student journalism
Wichita Falls High School's journalism program publishes the school's newspaper and yearbook.

Mrs. Anetta Reusch managed the award-winning program for numerous years until her retirement in 2013. Mr. Jason Byas has since taken the reins of the organization as the faculty adviser.

In 2013, the organization was reevaluated and the two publications were restructured to publish under the entity WFHS Publishing. The move was meant to save cost for the newspaper and yearbook and improve communication throughout the program and the publications it publishes.

Since the restructuring, the newspaper, The Coyote News, for the first time in over five years, made a profit and the yearbook increased yearly sales.

The newspaper runs an online edition of the paper. WFHS Publishing has also published a history guide to Wichita Falls High School that is available on their website.

Junior Reserve Officer Training Corps

The Wichita Falls High School Junior Reserve Officer Training Corps Army program was established in 1951. The battalion is officially recognized as the Coyote Battalion. Since its establishment the Junior Reserve Officer Training Corp program has competed statewide and nationally as well as hosting the annual "The Wichita" JROTC Drill meet during November every year. They have an average participation body of 130 cadets per year. The Battalion received the gold level presidential service award in 2019, and are considered an honor unit with distinction (Yellow Star) by the U.S. Army JROTC.

Rivalry
Wichita Falls High School has participated in the rivalry against Rider High School since the completion of Rider in 1961. Beginning the week of the infamous game, the Wichita Falls Police Department reports an increase in vandalism, theft, and attacks from both sides.

Notable alumni
Frank Kell Cahoon, Class of 1952, former member of the Texas House of Representatives from Midland
Gabriel P. Disosway, Class of 1927, United States Air Force four-star general
Johnny Genung, Class of 1959, Texas Longhorns football player, inducted into Longhorn's Hall of Honor in 2004.
Joe Golding, Class of 1998, college basketball coach at Abilene Christian and UTEP
Bevis M. Griffin, black glam rockstar
David Farabee, Class of 1982, member of the Texas House from Wichita Falls since 1999
Ed Neal, NFL player
Bernard Scott, Class of 2003, NFL player
Jim Turner, American football player
Thomas W. Fowler, Class of 1939, Medal of Honor Recipient for his actions in World War II, Fowler Elementary named him in Wichita Falls ISD

See also
Hirschi High School
S. H. Rider High School

References

External links

Wichita Falls ISD
Wichita Falls High School Coyote football
 Campus facts 2007–2008

Schools in Wichita County, Texas
High schools in Wichita Falls, Texas
Public high schools in Texas